Beth Hamilton (born October 25, 1980) is a Canadian curler from St. John's, Newfoundland and Labrador. She currently plays second on Team Sarah Hill. She is a three-time Newfoundland and Labrador Scotties Tournament of Hearts champion.

Career
Hamilton competed in two Canadian Junior Curling Championships in 1999 and 2000, playing lead for Laura Strong on both occasions. They finished with a 2–10 record in 1999 and with a 4–8 record in 2000. She won her first Newfoundland and Labrador Scotties Tournament of Hearts in 2005 playing second for Heather Strong. They finished 1–10 at the 2005 Scott Tournament of Hearts, held in St. John's. She would not win another provincial championship for fourteen years until her team of Kelli Sharpe, Stephanie Guzzwell and Carrie Vautour won the 2019 Newfoundland and Labrador Scotties, defeating Cathlia Ward in the final. The team struggled at the 2019 Scotties Tournament of Hearts however, finishing tied for last in their pool with a 1–6 record. The following season, she joined the Erica Curtis rink with Erin Porter at third and Julie Devereaux at second. The team won three straight sudden death games to win the 2020 Newfoundland and Labrador Scotties Tournament of Hearts. At the 2020 Scotties Tournament of Hearts, they finished in fourteenth place with a 1–6 record.

Hamilton joined the Sarah Hill rink for the 2020–21 season. Due to the COVID-19 pandemic in Newfoundland and Labrador, many teams had to opt out of the 2021 Newfoundland and Labrador Scotties Tournament of Hearts as they could not commit to the quarantine process in order to compete in the 2021 Scotties Tournament of Hearts. This meant that only Team Hill and their clubmates Mackenzie Mitchell's rink entered the event. In the best-of-five series, Team Hill defeated Team Mitchell three games to one to earn the right to represent Newfoundland and Labrador at the 2021 Scotties in Calgary, Alberta. At the Tournament of Hearts, they finished with a 2–6 round robin record, with wins against New Brunswick's Melissa Adams and Nunavut's Lori Eddy.

The following season, the provincial championship was cancelled due to the pandemic. As the highest ranked team on the CTRS standings, Team Hill were appointed to represent Newfoundland and Labrador at the 2022 Scotties Tournament of Hearts in Thunder Bay, Ontario. The team once again finished the national championship with a 2–6 record, beating Nunavut's Brigitte MacPhail and upsetting Northern Ontario's Krista McCarville in their two victories.

Personal life
Hamilton studied pharmacy at Memorial University of Newfoundland and currently works as a pharmacist at Lawtons. She is in a relationship with Stephen Sharpe.

Teams

References

External links

1980 births
Canadian women curlers
Curlers from Newfoundland and Labrador
Living people
Sportspeople from St. John's, Newfoundland and Labrador
Memorial University of Newfoundland alumni